Emre Bekir (born 17 August 1998) is a Turkish professional footballer who plays as a left back for Fethiyespor.

Professional career
Bekir made his professional debut with Alanyaspor in a 1–1 tie Başakşehir Istanbuk on 27 May 2019.

In August 2019, Bekir left for a loan spell with Zemplín Michalovce, of Slovak Fortuna liga. Bekir, however, only made a single appearance in Slovnaft Cup against lower (5th division) club FK Krásnohorské Podhradie. However, he only played the first half of the game, playing as a left back. He was replaced by Dimitris Popovits. In January 2020, he had returned to Turkish Alanyaspor. On 15 January 2020, he then moved to TFF Third League club Fethiyespor for the rest of the season.

On 4 January 2023, Bekir returned to Fethiyespor, now in TFF Second League.

References

External links
 
 
 
 

1998 births
Living people
People from Samsun Province
Turkish footballers
Association football defenders
Alanyaspor footballers
MFK Zemplín Michalovce players
Fethiyespor footballers
İskenderun FK footballers
Süper Lig players
TFF Second League players
TFF Third League players
Expatriate footballers in Slovakia
Turkish expatriate sportspeople in Slovakia